Moderator may refer to:

Government

Moderator (town official), elected official who presides over the Town Meeting form of government in various American states.

Internet
Internet forum moderator, a person given special authority to enforce the rules on a forum or social media platforms
Game moderator
 Moderator of a Usenet newsgroup
Google Moderator, an application to assist chairmen of online meetings

Religion
Moderator of the General Assembly, the chairperson of the highest court in Presbyterian and Reformed churches
Moderators and clerks in the Church of Scotland, the chairperson of any of the courts of the Church of Scotland
Moderator of the curia, an administrative position in the Catholic church

Nuclear engineering 
Neutron moderator, a medium that reduces the velocity of fast neutrons, for example in a nuclear reactor

Other uses
Moderator variable, in statistics, a qualitative or quantitative variable that affects the direction and/or strength of the relation between dependent and independent variables
Sound moderator, a suppressor attached to a firearm
A faction in the Regulator–Moderator War
Discussion moderator, a person who controls the tone of a discussion or debate